Syzeuxis is a genus of moths in the family Geometridae erected by George Hampson in 1895.

Species
Syzeuxis heteromeces Prout, 1926
Syzeuxis magnidica Prout, 1926
Syzeuxis nigrinotata Warren, 1896
Syzeuxis seminanis Prout, 1926
Syzeuxis subfasciaria Wehrli, 1924
Syzeuxis tessellifimbria Prout, 1926
Syzeuxis trinotaria Moore, 1868

References

Larentiinae